Robo may refer to:

robot, an electro-mechanical device that can perform autonomous or preprogrammed tasks
Automation (robo-), roboticization
Robo (musician) (born 1955), Roberto Valverde, drummer in punk bands Black Flag and The Misfits
Robo (Chrono Trigger), a playable character in the 1995 video game Chrono Trigger
Robotrippin, non-medical use of the pharmaceutical dextromethorphan (DXM or Robo)
Robo, an aircraft design study undertaken in the late 1950s for a Rocket Bomber, absorbed into the abortive X-20 Dyna-Soar project
Robomower, the robotic mulching lawnmower sold by Friendly Robotics
Roborovski hamster, the smallest and fastest breed of Hamster. Kept as a domestic pet.
Roundabout (gene family), the Drosophila melanogaster gene involved in axon guidance in the CNS
Robo (film), a 2008 Indian Malayalam film
FC Robo, a football club from Lagos, Nigeria

See also

Roboman (disambiguation)
Robot (disambiguation)